Yayla is the Turkish word for highland, cognate with yaylak. It may refer to:

 Yayla (resort), the name given to tribal yaylaks and summer mountain resorts in Turkey.
 Yaylak, Turkic summer highland pastures, equivalent for the alpine pasture and the associated alpine transhumance
 Yayla Mountains is the Turkish name for the Crimean Mountains
  since this is a common root word in Turkish enriched with suffixes to make other words. It and its derivatives are also used as place names, person names, and brand names.